The Nahang is an Iranian-made class of midget submarine designed for shallow water operations. Only one prototype of this class is known to be completed, although its characteristics have remained unclear.

History
Iran had shown interest in midget submarines in the 1980s. According to the Conway's All The World's Fighting Ships, Iran assembled a midget in Bandar Abbas that was completed in 1987 in an unsuccessful attempt. Iran reportedly purchased a second midget of another design from North Korea, delivered in 1988.

Existence of Nahang was first known in April 2006. On 6 March 2006, Iranian state television announced that Nahang 1 has been commissioned into the Southern Fleet. Later that year in late August, she participated in the third phase of Zarbat-e Zolfaghar wargame.

Two other submarines in the class were allegedly planned, but building further units is considered unlikely.

In April 2017, Bellingcat reported that for the first time in years, satellite imagery suggests Nahang had been deployed for a mission.

Description
There is not much confidently known about characteristics of the class. According to Jane's Fighting Ships, the class displaces  when at the surface and  while submerged.

Nahang is reportedly unarmed and not fitted with torpedoes, however there are contradicting reports suggesting it has a pair of 533mm torpedo tubes in drop collars and can carry and lay four MDM-6 or EM-52 naval mines. Nahang may be utilized as a mothership for swimmer delivery vehicles and a platform for special operations.

The submarine has no sonar on the report of Jane's, but another account suggests that she is equipped with active/passive sonar on her bow. The machinery installed for propulsion is unknown. Other apparatus reportedly installed include a mast with electronic warfare support capabilities (similar to Russian-made 'Stop Light' type) and surface search and navigation radar.

See also

 List of submarine classes in service
 List of naval ship classes of Iran
 List of military equipment manufactured in Iran

References

External links
Nahang-class Midget Submarine at GlobalSecurity.org
9xx Nahang - 2007 at cmano-db.com
Nahang Class at Covert Shores

Submarine classes of the Islamic Republic of Iran Navy
 
Midget submarines
Experimental submarines
Ships built by Marine Industries Organization